George Hammond Whalley (22 January 1813 – 8 October 1878) was a British lawyer and Liberal Party politician.

He was the eldest son of James Whalley, a merchant and banker from Gloucester, and a direct descendant of Edward Whalley, the regicide. George was educated at University College London, gaining a first class degree in Metaphysics and Rhetoric. He entered Gray's Inn in 1835, and was called to the bar in 1839. He was an assistant tithe commissioner between 1836 and 1847, writing over 200 articles for the Justice of the Peace between 1838 and 1842. In 1838 and 1839 he published a pair of treatises on the Tithe Acts, which were expanded and published in 1848 as The Tithe Act and the Whole of the Tithe Amendment Acts.

In 1846 he married Anne Wakeford, with whom he had a son and two daughters.  During the Great Famine in 1847 he established several fisheries on the Irish west coast. In 1852 he was made Sheriff of Caernarvonshire,
a deputy lieutenant of Denbighshire,
and a captain in the Denbighshire Yeomanry.

He was chairman of the Llanidloes and Newtown Railway, the first in Montgomeryshire, from its inception in 1852 and was the first chairman of the Mid-Wales Railway in 1859. He was also active in the Railway Benevolent Institution and the National Temperance League.

Parliamentary career 
He unsuccessfully stood for Parliament at the 1852 general election in Montgomery, and was returned to Parliament on his second attempt at a by-election in December 1852
for the City of Peterborough.
There were reports of irregularities in the election, which had been heavily influenced by Earl Fitzwilliam, and his election was voided on 8 June 1853. A second by-election was held on 25 June 1853, when Whalley was re-elected.
Another election petition was lodged, and a Committee of the House of Commons was established in July 1853 to investigate the case. The committee determined that he had not been legitimately elected, and reinstated his opponent, Thomson Hankey. He was once again elected, however, in the 1859 general election.

An Anglican, Whalley was persuaded to lead the parliamentary campaign against Roman Catholicism, taking over from the ailing Richard Spooner. His principal aim was to abolish the Maynooth Grant, claiming that Britain was paying for the creation of Catholic priests whose goal was to turn Britain into a "citadel of Popery". His three motions for the creation of a committee to consider repeal of the grant were all defeated in 1861, 1862, and 1863, and he experienced difficulty in getting his anti-Catholic speeches heard due to opposition from the numerous Irish MPs.

In 1866 he claimed to have evidence that Vatican machinations had caused the defeat of British troops in New Zealand, that Cardinal Cullen, the Irish primate, intended to place a Stuart pretender on the throne of England, and that the Pope had taken control of the British artillery corps, the police, the telegraph office, and railway companies. He was also a zealous supporter of Arthur Orton, the notorious Tichborne Claimant, and was eventually jailed by Lord Chief Justice Cockburn, who tried the case, for contempt of court.

He died insolvent in 1878, still in office. His son, George Hampden Whalley, was MP for Peterborough between 1880 and 1883.

References

External links 
 

1813 births
1878 deaths
Alumni of University College London
British Yeomanry officers
Deputy Lieutenants of Denbighshire
Liberal Party (UK) MPs for English constituencies
Members of Gray's Inn
UK MPs 1852–1857
UK MPs 1859–1865
UK MPs 1865–1868
UK MPs 1868–1874
UK MPs 1874–1880
British Anglicans
High Sheriffs of Caernarvonshire
English Anglicans
Denbighshire Hussars officers